Queer as Folk is a 1999 British television series that chronicles the lives of three gay men living in Manchester's gay village around Canal Street. Initially running for eight episodes, a two-part follow up was shown in 2000. It was written by Russell T Davies and produced by Red Production Company for Channel 4.

Background 
The title of the programme comes from a historic English saying, "there's nowt so queer as folk", meaning "there's nothing as strange as people"; which is a word play on the modern-day English sense of "queer", as homosexual. The script had originally started life with the title Queer as Fuck but Queer as Folk was considered more suitable.

Characters and plot 
The main characters are Stuart Allen Jones (Aidan Gillen), who is highly sexually active, and successfully so. His long-time friend Vince Tyler (Craig Kelly), who has a crush on Stuart, has less luck with men. 15-year-old Nathan Maloney (Charlie Hunnam) is new to the gay scene but is not lacking in self-confidence.

The producers say that Queer as Folk, although superficially a realistic depiction of gay urban life in the 1990s, is meant as a fantasy, and that Stuart, Vince, and Nathan are not so much characters as gay male archetypes.

Stuart, an advertising executive, possesses intrinsic power, able to bend anything to his will. Stuart's principal characteristic is that he does whatever he wants, whenever he wants, however he wants. He blows up a car belonging to his friend Alexander's antagonistic mother (in the second series). He invites Vince's female colleague, who has a crush on closeted Vince, to Vince's birthday party and then introduces Vince's boyfriend. When offered a test drive of a Jeep by a car salesman who makes some homophobic comments, Stuart drives the car straight through the large window of the car dealership.

In the second series, the tone became somewhat more serious, with each of the main characters having to make hard choices concerning their futures.

Reception 
At the time, the response was mixed from gay commentators in relation to the portrayal of the characters. The show was criticised by the gay press for not addressing the issue of the AIDS epidemic. In the wider press and media, a commentator in the Daily Mail called for censorship. 20 years after the show first aired, however, Queer as Folk was generally praised.

The first four episodes were sponsored by Beck's Brewery but the company withdrew their sponsorship halfway through the series. Following a backlash from the gay community, Beck's offered to sponsor the second series, a request which was refused by the producers.

In 2010, The Guardian ranked Queer as Folk at number 13 in their list of "The Top 50 TV Dramas of All Time".

Awards 
Gillen was nominated for Best Actor at the 1999 BAFTA TV Award for his role, whilst the series was nominated for Best Drama Serial at the 1999 Royal Television Society Awards.

Music 
The theme song for the series was created by Murray Gold. A soundtrack album was released by Almighty Records for the original series and features tracks by OT Quartet, Ultra Naté, and Blondie. Selling 125,000 copies, it remained popular long after the broadcast of the first series and ended up the 50th biggest selling compilation album of 1999. An album for the second series was released by Channel 4 Music and sold 19,000 copies in its first week to debut at #5 on the UK Compilation Chart.

Cast 

 Aidan Gillen as Stuart Alan Jones, a successful advertising executive
 Craig Kelly as Vince Tyler, a supermarket manager
 Charlie Hunnam as Nathan Maloney, a 15-year-old rebel
 Denise Black as Hazel Tyler; Vince's free-spirited mother
 Andy Devine as Bernard Thomas; Hazel's lodger
 Jason Merrells as Phil Delaney; a close friend of Vince and Stuart
 Esther Hall as Romey Sullivan; whose baby Stuart fathered by donating his sperm
 Saira Todd as Lisa Levene; Romey's partner
 Carla Henry as Donna Clark; Nathan's best friend
 Ben Maguire as Christian Hobbs; an arrogant classmate of Nathan and Donna
 Alison Burrows as Sandra Docherty; Stuart’s Assistant 
 Caroline Pegg as Rosalie Cotter; one of Vince's co-workers, who is romantically interested in him
 Caroline O'Neill as Janice Maloney; Nathan's mother
 Antony Cotton as Alexander Perry; a flamboyant friend of Vince and Stuart
 Peter O'Brien as Cameron Roberts; Phil's accountant who starts a relationship with Vince
 Jonathon Natynczyk as Dazz Collinson; a bartender who has a brief relationship with Nathan
 Maria Doyle Kennedy as Marie Jones Threepwood; Stuart's recently divorced sister
 John Brobbey as Lance Amponah; Romey and Lisa's lodger

Episodes

Series 1 (1999)

Series 2 (2000)

Ratings

Series 1 (1999)

Series 2 (2000)

Spin-offs 
A spin-off series, Misfits (no relation to the later E4 series of the same name), was initially commissioned by Channel 4. The series would have followed the characters of Hazel, Alexander, Donna (who was absent from the 2nd series due to scheduling commitments) and Bernard from the original series, while introducing new characters. Although Davies developed draft scripts for four episodes and storylines for a further twenty-two, the series was cancelled before it went into pre-production.

As a result of Channel 4's decision, Davies pulled out of a deal that would have seen a series of Queer as Folk short stories published on the broadcaster's website, and vowed not to work with Channel 4 again, unless he has an idea that only works on that channel. However, fifteen years later in 2015, Davies returned to Channel 4 with drama series Cucumber, drama anthology Banana (on E4) and documentary series Tofu (on 4oD). Denise Black makes a cameo appearance as Hazel Tyler's ghost in the sixth episode of Cucumber.

American versions
Driven by the success of the series, American cable channel Showtime and Canadian cable channel Showcase co-produced an American version, Queer as Folk. This is set in Pittsburgh, Pennsylvania although was filmed in Toronto, Ontario.

In late 2018, a second American adaptation was in development for Bravo. In April 2021, it received a series order from Peacock, the streaming service it shifted to within the NBCUniversal family. It reimagines this series instead of serving as a reboot of the first American series. Queer as Folk (2022 TV series) was released on June 9, 2022 on Peacock.

See also

The L Word

References

External links

20 Years of Queer as Folk - Edinburgh TV Festival 2019 at YouTube

1999 British television series debuts
2000 British television series endings
1990s British LGBT-related drama television series
2000s British LGBT-related drama television series
Channel 4 television dramas
English-language television shows
Gay-related television shows
Television shows written by Russell T Davies
Serial drama television series
Television series created by Russell T Davies
Television series by Red Production Company
Television shows set in Manchester